The 2004 Walsall Metropolitan Borough Council election took place on 10 June 2004 to elect members of Walsall Metropolitan Borough Council in the West Midlands, England. The whole council was up for election with boundary changes since the last election in 2003. The Conservative Party gained overall control of the council from no overall control.

Background
Before the election the council was run by a coalition between the Conservative and Liberal Democrat parties, with Labour holding 27 seats, the Conservatives 24, Liberal Democrats 7 and UK Independence Party 2. 60 seats were contested with the candidates including 7 from the British National Party.

Election result
The results saw the Conservatives win a majority on the council with 35 of the 60 seats. Labour were reduced to 16 seats, with the chairs of the West Midlands Police Authority and West Midlands Passenger Transport Executive, Mohammed Nazir and Richard Worrell, among those to lose at the election. Meanwhile, the Liberal Democrats won 6 seats and there was 1 independent, while the 2 UK Independence Party councillors both lost their seats.

After results were declared, a box with 200 ballot papers in it was discovered underneath a table. These were then counted, but the returning officer did not include them in the declarations, as they said it would not have affected the results.

Ward results

References

2004 English local elections
2004
2000s in the West Midlands (county)